Daniel Bryer is an English songwriter, producer and multi-instrumentalist. 

He has written and produced songs for artists such as Westlife, One Direction, Alan Walker, Niall Horan, JP Cooper, Rag'n'Bone Man & James TW.

Notable songs written by Bryer include  "Little Bit of Love" by Tom Grennan, "This Town" by Niall Horan, "Skin" by Rag'n'Bone Man, and "Tired" by Alan Walker. Bryer’s production credits include "Home" & "What a Feeling" by One Direction, "Starlight" by Westlife and "Put A Little Love On Me" by Niall Horan.

Bryer has contributed to four Top10 Albums in the US & UK, and three Top10 Singles. Human by Rag'n'Bone Man & Flicker by Niall Horan both achieved No.1 spots in the UK & US respectively.

Bryer's composition "Little Bit of Love" by Tom Grennan received a nomination for Song Of The Year at the 2022 Brit Awards.

Bryer's songwriting & production debut "What a Feeling" from One Direction’s album 'Made in the A.M.' topped Rolling Stone's 'Readers' Poll' as the best track One Direction ever released.

Bryer is a frequent collaborator of Mike Needle & Jamie Scott, with the three working together at Scott’s publishing company Catherine Songs.

Discography

Awards and nominations 

Ivor Novello Award

|-
|style="text-align:center;"| 2022 ||style="text-align:left;"|Little Bit Of Love
|| PRS For Music Award ||

References 

English songwriters
English record producers
1989 births
Living people